SASTRA-CNR Rao Award is an award instituted by SASTRA University, a private and deemed university in the town of Thirumalaisamudram, Thanjavur district, Tamil Nadu, to honor excellence in chemistry and material science, the two areas in which  C N R Rao has made great, important and substantial contributions. The Award was instituted in 2013 and the first award was presented jointly to Suresh Das the then Director of National Institute for Interdisciplinary Science & Technology, Thiruvananthapuram and Sourav Pal, the Director of National Chemical Laboratory, Pune on 28 February 2014. The award carries a cash prize of Rs. 5 lakh and a citation.

Awardees

See also

SASTRA Ramanujan Prize

References

Science and technology awards
Indian science and technology awards
Awards established in 2013